William Laughlin Maxwell (born 1 July 1934) is an American engineer.

William L. Maxwell was born in Philadelphia on 1 July 1934, and attended Central High School. He subsequently attended Cornell University. During his studies, Maxwell met Andrew Schultz Jr. and Richard W. Conway. After Maxwell completed his bachelor's in mechanical engineering in 1957, Schultz convinced him to stay for a Ph.D., with which he graduated in 1961. Maxwell remained at Cornell as a faculty member, where he was later appointed to a named professorship in industrial engineering named after Schultz. In 1998, Maxwell was elected a member of the United States National Academy of Engineering "[f]or the theory and practice of real-time production planning and scheduling systems." That same year, he retired from Cornell and became a senior scientist at Arkieva.

References

Members of the United States National Academy of Engineering
Cornell University faculty
1934 births
Living people
20th-century American engineers
21st-century American engineers
American industrial engineers
American mechanical engineers
Scientists from Philadelphia
Central High School (Philadelphia) alumni
Engineers from Pennsylvania
American computer scientists
Cornell University alumni